Surprise Surprise is a British light entertainment television programme for ITV that originally ran from 6 May 1984 to 26 December 2001 with Cilla Black as the host. The show returned from 21 October 2012 to 26 July 2015 and was hosted by Holly Willoughby.

Format
The show was hosted by Cilla Black, and filmed in front of a studio audience. Its premise involved surprising members of the public with long-held wishes, setting up tricks to fool members of the public, making prank calls to people and reuniting guests with long-lost loved ones. Black was assisted for eight series by Bob Carolgees, famous for his glove puppetry act Spit the Dog, while Gordon Burns and Tessa Sanderson were roving reporters. Other featured acts were "Cilla-grams," where Black would perform a song in a musical sketch relevant to the surprise a person was receiving. (Example: a soldier was celebrating his 21st birthday, so the featuring song Black sang was "Celebration" by Kool & The Gang.)

The concept of the first series had been to film surprising and often unusual moments similar to those previously seen on Game for a Laugh, but the format was not successful. However, the final item in the last episode of the first series featured a successful surprise reunion, which led executive producer Alan Boyd to change the format slightly so that all items in subsequent series involved surprises, rather than just being surprising. Although including many pre-filmed inserts, the first series and some early episodes of the second series were televised live in their entirety, but thereafter all episodes were pre-recorded.

From 1984 to 1988, the show was broadcast on Sunday evenings. From 1989 to 1992, the show moved to Fridays, before returning to the Sunday evening timeslot from 1993 to 1996. The final series of the original run in 1997 was broadcast on Friday evenings.

Over the years, the show had many special guests, some of whom appeared live, including Neil Diamond. Many variety acts were also featured on the show. The Spice Girls made their live debut on an episode in 1996.

Revival
In March 2012, it was announced that Holly Willoughby would host a revamped one-off episode of Surprise Surprise for ITV, although a full series was later announced. The series had six hour-long episodes, with episode 1 airing on 21 October 2012. A second series followed this in 2013, a third in 2014 and a fourth in 2015.

In the show, Willoughby is joined by various locations reporters, these have included Marvin Humes, Mark Wright, Dave Berry, Peter Andre and Matt Johnson.

In one 2013 episode, Cilla Black made a surprise appearance on the show, singing a bit of the original theme as the show went to commercials (after Holly made the comment that the producers just wouldn't let her sing the song).

A previously unbroadcast episode of the show which was hosted by Black and featured appearances from Irish band Westlife and singer Gareth Gates, which was originally produced in 2003 to celebrate the series' 20th anniversary, was broadcast on ITV3 on 27 December 2015, four months after Black's death. It wasn't broadcast in 2003 due to Black's departure from ITV that year.

Theme songs
Cilla Black introduced and closed each show by singing a theme song. The theme song from series one to eight was written by Kate Robbins and was often imitated by Black impersonators, beginning "The more the world is changing, the more it stays the same...". The track was included on Black's 1985 album Surprisingly Cilla, and as a single through Towerbell Records. A new song was written from series nine until the show's conclusion in 2001, and the 2003 birthday special: "Reaching out, holding hands, reliving memories... Life is full, full of surprises...And the nicest surprise in my life is you!"

The revived series updated its theme for 2013. This theme uses a remixed instrumental version of the chorus from Black's original song "Surprise, Surprise".

Transmissions

Series
Original

Revival

Specials
Original

Revival

Awards

International versions

References

External links
Official Twitter page
Surprise Surprise at itv.com

1984 British television series debuts
2015 British television series endings
1990s British television series
2000s British television series
British reality television series
British television shows featuring puppetry
Cilla Black
ITV (TV network) original programming
London Weekend Television shows
Television series by ITV Studios
British television series revived after cancellation
English-language television shows